Mesorhizobium acaciae is a bacterium from the genus of Mesorhizobium which has been isolated from the nodules of the tree Acacia melanoxylon in Guangdong in China.

References 

Phyllobacteriaceae
Bacteria described in 2015